Baruch Hassan (born 1959), is a former Israeli footballer who played in Maccabi Netanya and Beitar Netanya.

He is of a Tunisian-Jewish origin.

Honours
Israeli Premier League (2):
1979-80, 1982–83
League Cup (2):
1982–83, 1983–84
Israeli Supercup (2):
1980, 1983
UEFA Intertoto Cup (3):
1980, 1983, 1984

References

1959 births
Living people
Israeli Jews
Israeli footballers
Maccabi Netanya F.C. players
Israeli people of Tunisian-Jewish descent
Association football defenders